RDES (the Regional Data Exchange System on food and agricultural statistics in Asia and Pacific countries) is a unitary statistical information system which includes a database on food and agricultural statistics and the web portal of APCAS (Asia and Pacific Commission on Agricultural Statistics) countries under the FAO/Japan cooperative regional project (GCP/RAS/184/JPN). RDES had operated from March 2003 to 2011. The concept of RDES is succeeded to the CountrySTAT project, FAOSTAT.

Database
RDES was designed to contribute to member nations' capacity building and policy analysis through the development of the food and agricultural statistical framework in APCAS countries. It is especially expected to role-play the database on food and agricultural statistics for users, such as policy-makers, decision-makers, researchers, etc.

Time scale
The calendar year is recommended as time scale of the RDES, due to the difference of the crop year in each country.

Definitions
Definitions of the data should be FAO definitions. The unit of the crop production data are production (metric ton), area harvested (hectare), and yield (kilogram per hectare).

Data items
Most data of RDES are crop production and livestock data. Although it depends on the background of food production in each country, the major 19 agricultural products in this region are registered as the basic data items: rice, wheat, maize, cereals, cassava, potatoes, pulses, groundnuts, soybean, seed cotton, sugar cane, tea, cattle, pigs, sheep, goats, chicken, milk total, and hen eggs.

Other data for food security that are required by users, such as other crops and livestock, land area, population, prices, fisheries, etc. are provided by each countries on the basis of its situation.

The database functions of RDES has been strengthened with the CountrySTAT technology. RDES with CountrySTAT was launched on 1 November 2006.

Web Portal
RDES is the gateway to agricultural statistics in APCAS countries. There are pages for each country, which contain not only agricultural statistics but also show the country profile, contact address, and hyperlinks for statistics in each country.

RDES also shows the external hyperlinks to related databases, organizations, and associations for agricultural statistics and food security Information, such as the FAOSTAT, UNSTAT, WFP, etc.

Participating nations
RDES is organizing in cooperation with most APCAS member nations: Bangladesh, Bhutan, Cambodia, the People's Republic of China, Fiji, India, Indonesia, Iran, the Lao People's Democratic Republic, Myanmar, Nepal, Pakistan, Philippines, Sri Lanka, Thailand, and Vietnam. Though some other APCAS countries (Australia, Japan (Donor), Malaysia, the Republic of Korea and the United States of America) are not the participants, but RDES is also organized with their cooperation.

External links
 RDES Home Page (closed)
 FAO Statistics Home Page
 CountrySTAT Web site 
 FAOSTAT Web site

Agricultural organizations
Agricultural databases
Web portals
Food and Agriculture Organization
Agriculture by region
Statistical databases

cs:Organizace pro výživu a zemědělství
da:FAO
de:Food and Agriculture Organization
es:Organización para la Alimentación y la Agricultura
eo:Organizaĵo pri Nutrado kaj Agrikulturo
fr:Organisation des Nations unies pour l'alimentation et l'agriculture
id:Organisasi Pangan dan Pertanian
it:FAO
nl:Voedsel- en Landbouworganisatie
ja:国際連合食糧農業機関
nn:FAO
pt:Organização das Nações Unidas para a Agricultura e a Alimentação
ru:Продовольственная и сельскохозяйственная организация ООН
tr:Gıda ve Tarım Teşkilatı
zh:联合国粮食及农业组织